The Martin Luther King Jr. Center for Nonviolent Social Change, commonly known as The King Center, is a nongovernmental, not-for-profit organization in Atlanta, United States.

History
The center was founded in 1968 by Coretta Scott King, who started the organization in the basement of the couple's home in the year following the 1968 assassination of her husband, Martin Luther King Jr.

In 1981, the center's headquarters were moved into the Martin Luther King Jr. National Historic Site facility on Auburn Avenue which includes King's birth home and the Ebenezer Baptist Church, where he preached from 1960 until his death.

In 1977, a memorial tomb was dedicated, and the remains of Martin Luther King Jr. were moved from South View Cemetery to the plaza that is nestled between the center and the church. Martin Luther King Jr.'s gravesite and a reflecting pool are also located next to Freedom Hall. Mrs. King was interred with her husband on February 7, 2006.

In 2012, King's youngest child, Bernice King, became the CEO.

Programs
The organization carries out initiatives on both the domestic and international level. The Martin Luther King Jr. Center for Nonviolent Social Change is dedicated to research, education and training in the principles, philosophy and methods of Kingian nonviolence.

Martin Luther King Jr. Nonviolent Peace Prize 
The Martin Luther King Jr. Nonviolent Peace Prize is awarded by the King Center.

A non-exhaustive list of recipients includes: Cesar Chavez (1973); Stanley Levison and Kenneth Kaunda (1978); Rosa Parks (1980); Martin Luther King Sr. and Richard Attenborough (1983); Corazon Aquino (1987); Mikhail Gorbachev (1991); and, on April 4, 2018the 50th anniversary of King's assassinationBen Ferencz and Bryan Stevenson.

References

External links 
 Official website

Monuments and memorials in Georgia (U.S. state)
Organizations based in Atlanta
Nonviolence organizations based in the United States
Memorials to Martin Luther King Jr.
Non-profit organizations based in Georgia (U.S. state)
Coretta Scott King
Old Fourth Ward
Martin Luther King Jr. National Historic Site and Preservation District
Civil rights movement museums
1968 establishments in Georgia (U.S. state)